Les Colocs (The Roommates) were a rock music group from Québec formed in 1990 in Montreal.

Profile
Founded in 1990 and fronted by Dédé Fortin, Les Colocs made music in Quebec French. Their sound, infused with brass sounds, was inspired by swing, country, blues and African music; in 1998, they collaborated with the Senegal-born Diouf brothers for the album Dehors novembre.

Members
Dédé Fortin (songwriting, vocals, guitar, drums, etc.)
Mike Sawatzky (guitar, saxophone & harmonica)
Serge Robert (double bass; later known as Mononc' Serge, quit after "Atrocetomique" for a solo career)
André Vanderbiest (double bass; replaced Serge Robert)
Patrick Esposito Di Napoli (harmonica; died of AIDS in 1994)
Jimmy Bourgoing (drums, quit before recording "Dehors novembre")
Justin Allard (drums, replaced Jimmy Bourgoing)
Jean-Denis Levasseur (clarinet & saxophone; joined for "Dehors novembre")
Mike-oxlong ' ' (double bass; replace jimmy)

Additional associated musicians
Louis Léger (guitar)
Cameron delay (guitar)
Mara Tremblay (violin)
Joel Zifkin (violin)
Guy Bélanger (harmonica)
Benoît Gagné (trombone)
Benoît Piché (trumpet)
Élage Diouf|El Hadji Fall Diouf (singer and percussionist)
Pape Abdou Karim Diouf (singer and percussionist)
Michel Dufour (drums)

Discography

Albums
 Les Colocs (1993)
 Atrocetomique (live; 1995)
 Dehors novembre (1998)
 Les années 1992-1995 (compilation; 2001)
 Suite 2116 (posthumous; 2001)
 Live 1993-1998 (live compilation; 2004)
 Il me parle de bonheur (2009)

Videography
Les Colocs: L'integrale 1993-2000

See also

List of bands from Canada
Canadian rock

References

External links
 
 Audio excerpts on Archambault.ca

Musical groups established in 1990
Musical groups disestablished in 2000
Musical groups from Montreal
Canadian folk rock groups
1990 establishments in Quebec
2000 disestablishments in Quebec